Barton Hall, also known as the Cunningham Plantation, is an antebellum plantation house near present-day Cherokee, Alabama.  Built in 1840, it is a stylistically rare example of Greek Revival architecture in Alabama, with elements from the late Federal period.  The house was designated a National Historic Landmark in 1973 for its architecture.

Description and history
The house is a -story wood-frame structure, with a clapboarded exterior, and a truncated hip roof topped by a belvedere. Single-story gable-roofed wings extend to the rear. The main facade is five bays wide, with a symmetrical arrangement of windows around the central entrance. The central bay is set off from the others by fluted pilasters, which also appear at the building corners. The entrance is sheltered by a deep porch supported by fluted Doric columns, and featuring Doric triglyphs in its cornice. The porch is topped by a balcony accessed via a second-story entrance stylistically similar to the main entrance below. The entrance is flanked by sidelight windows and topped by a transom window and eared architrave.

Period interior features include a unique stairway which ascends in a series of double flights and bridge-like landings to an observatory on the rooftop that offered views of the plantation.

In 1840, Armestead Barton, a native of Tennessee, moved to the area and purchased , on which he began construction of this house.  The house remained unfinished at the time of his death in 1847 and was completed two years later under his widow's supervision.  The property was sold out of the Barton family in 1908.  In 1967, a Barton descendant repurchased the house.

In November 2008, the noted photographer Charles Moore took his final documented images on this property.  The home continues to be privately owned and occupied, and it is not open to the public.

Gallery

See also

List of National Historic Landmarks in Alabama
National Register of Historic Places listings in Colbert County, Alabama

References

External links

Houses in Colbert County, Alabama
National Historic Landmarks in Alabama
Houses on the National Register of Historic Places in Alabama
Houses completed in 1840
Plantation houses in Alabama
Greek Revival houses in Alabama
Antebellum architecture
Historic American Buildings Survey in Alabama